Barnes is a city in Washington County, Kansas, United States.  As of the 2020 census, the population of the city was 165.

History
Barnes was originally called Elm Grove when it was founded in 1870. It was renamed Barnes in 1876 in honor of A. S. Barnes, a stockholder of the Central Branch Union Pacific Railroad

Barnes was a station and shipping point on the Missouri Pacific Railroad.

Geography
Barnes is located at  (39.711525, -96.873094).

Demographics

2010 census
As of the census of 2010, there were 159 people, 71 households, and 45 families residing in the city. The racial makeup of the city was 95.0% White, 1.3% Native American, and 3.8% from other races. Hispanic or Latino of any race were 5.0% of the population.

There were 71 households, of which 22.5% had children under the age of 18 living with them, 46.5% were married couples living together, 11.3% had a female householder with no husband present, 5.6% had a male householder with no wife present, and 36.6% were non-families. 35.2% of all households were made up of individuals, and 14.1% had someone living alone who was 65 years of age or older. The average household size was 2.24 and the average family size was 2.82.

The median age in the city was 44.2 years. 23.9% of residents were under the age of 18; 5.6% were between the ages of 18 and 24; 22% were from 25 to 44; 27% were from 45 to 64; and 21.4% were 65 years of age or older. The gender makeup of the city was 52.2% male and 47.8% female.

2000 census
As of the census of 2000, there were 152 people, 74 households, and 46 families residing in the city. The racial makeup of the city was 98.03% White, 0.66% Asian, and 1.32% from two or more races. Hispanic or Latino of any race were 0.66% of the population.

There were 74 households, out of which 14.9% had children under the age of 18 living with them, 56.8% were married couples living together, 4.1% had a female householder with no husband present, and 37.8% were non-families. 37.8% of all households were made up of individuals, and 17.6% had someone living alone who was 65 years of age or older. The average household size was 2.05 and the average family size was 2.67.

In the city, the population was spread out, with 16.4% under the age of 18, 4.6% from 18 to 24, 25.7% from 25 to 44, 19.1% from 45 to 64, and 34.2% who were 65 years of age or older. The median age was 47 years. For every 100 females, there were 87.7 males. For every 100 females age 18 and over, there were 81.4 males.

The median income for a household in the city was $25,682, and the median income for a family was $26,023. Males had a median income of $24,286 versus $18,750 for females. The per capita income for the city was $16,446. About 4.4% of families and 7.3% of the population were below the poverty line, including none of those under the age of eighteen and 4.5% of those 65 or over.

Education
Barnes is served by USD 223 Barnes Hanover Linn.

Barnes schools were closed in 1965 through school unification. The Barnes High School mascot was Bullets.

Notable people
 Omar Knedlik, (1915–1989), inventor of the ICEE frozen drink.
 Joe Vogler, (1913-1993), Alaskan politician

See also
 Central Branch Union Pacific Railroad

References

Further reading

External links

 City of Barnes
 Barnes - Directory of Public Officials
 USD 223, local school district
 Barnes city map, KDOT

Cities in Kansas
Cities in Washington County, Kansas
1870 establishments in Kansas
Populated places established in 1870